Sid Ahmed Belkedrouci (born on 20 december 1950 in Oujda, Morocco) is an Algerian football manager and former player.

Honours

Personal
 Best scorer in the Algerian championship 1975 with MC Oran with 18 goals

Club
 Algerian Championnat National winner once in 1971 with MC Oran
 Algerian Cup winner once in 1975 with MC Oran

National
 Gold medal in 1978 All-Africa Games.

External links
 Tribute to Belkedrouci - mouloudia.com
 BELKEDROUCI: Un tempérament d’attaquant

Living people
1950 births
Algerian footballers
Algeria international footballers
RCG Oran players
MC Oran players
GC Mascara players
USM Bel Abbès players
People from Oujda
African Games gold medalists for Algeria
African Games medalists in football
Association football midfielders
Competitors at the 1978 All-Africa Games
21st-century Algerian people
20th-century Algerian people